Raphitoma papillosa is a species of sea snail, a marine gastropod mollusk in the family Raphitomidae.

Description
The length of the shell varies between 5 mm and 10 mm.

The elongated, fusiform shell has a pointed spire. The shell contains 7 convex whorls, of which two smooth whorls in the protoconch. They show many pronounced axial ribs and smaller decurrent, lamellar threads forming a reticulation with nodules. The suture is impressed. The body whorl measures more than half the length of the shell. The aperture is suboval. The columella is straight. The siphonal canal is wide and open. The outer lip is rounded and somewhat thickened and denticled inside. The sutural sinus is narrow and well-marked. The ground color of the shell is yellow on which the reticulation comes off in white.

Distribution
Considered as endemic to the Gulf of Gabès, Tunisia, sporadic records from Lampedusa Island and Sardinia seem to witness a range wider than supposed. Conversely the records from northern Adriatic Sea is not deemed to be reliable.

References

 Gofas, S.; Le Renard, J.; Bouchet, P. (2001). Mollusca. in: Costello, M.J. et al. (eds), European Register of Marine Species: a check-list of the marine species in Europe and a bibliography of guides to their identification. Patrimoines Naturels. 50: 180-213. 
 Giannuzzi-Savelli R., Pusateri F. & Bartolini S., 2018. A revision of the Mediterranean Raphitomidae (Gastropoda: Conoidea) 5: loss of planktotrophy and pairs of species, with the description of four new species. Bollettino Malacologico 54, Suppl. 11: 1-77

External links
 
 Gastropods.com: Raphitoma papillosa papillosa
 Natural History Museum, Rotterdam: Raphitoma papillosa

papillosa
Gastropods described in 1904